Viljandi railway station is a railway station serving the town of Viljandi in southern Estonia.

The station is the southern terminus of the Tallinn–Viljandi railway line. The station opened in 1897 when a narrow-gauge railway line was opened connecting Mõisaküla with Vijandi, which was prolonged to Tallinn in 1901. 

The narrow-gauge railway between Mõisaküla og Viljandi was closed in 1973. Currently, the station is owned by the railway infrastructure company Edelaraudtee and served by trains operated by the government-owned passenger train operator Elron.

See also
 List of railway stations in Estonia
 Rail transport in Estonia
 History of rail transport in Estonia

References

External links

 Official website of Edelaraudtee – a railway infrastructure company which owns the railway lines from Tallinn to Rapla, Pärnu & Viljandi
 Official website of Elron – the national passenger train operating company of Estonia operating all domestic passenger train services

Railway stations in Estonia
Railway stations opened in 1897
Viljandi